Halfyard is a surname. Notable people with the surname include:

 David Halfyard (1931–1996), Kent cricketer
 William Halfyard (1869–1944), Newfoundland politician